Nyirenda may refer to:

 Charlton Nyirenda (born 1988), Malawian swimmer
 Harry Nyirenda (born 1990), Malawian footballer
 Thomas Nyirenda (born 1986), Zambian football player
 Victor Nyirenda (born 1988), Malawian footballer
 Zindaba Nyirenda, Zambian princess and author
Malawian surnames
Zambian surnames